The 2021 Challenge Tour was the 33rd season of the Challenge Tour, the official development tour to the European Tour. The tour started as the Satellite Tour with its first Order of Merit rankings in 1989 and was officially renamed as the Challenge Tour at the start of the 1990 season.

Similarly to 2020, the season was due to begin in February with three tournaments in South Africa co-sanctioned with the Sunshine Tour, but in mid-January the South African swing was postponed to April–May over COVID-19 pandemic concerns. The official schedule announcement was made on 27 January 2021. In April two back-to-back events in Sweden in May were added.

In August, it was announced that the Hainan Open and the Foshan Open; both played in China, were cancelled. Later in the month, replacement tournaments were confirmed in Spain, both hosted at Empordà Golf on the Costa Brava.

Schedule
The following table lists official events during the 2021 season.

Challenge Tour Rankings
For full rankings, see 2021 Challenge Tour graduates.

The rankings were titled as the Road to Mallorca and were based on prize money won during the season, calculated using a points-based system. The top 20 players on the tour earned status to play on the 2022 European Tour.

See also
2021 European Tour
2021–22 Sunshine Tour

Notes

References

External links
Schedule on the European Tour's official site
Rankings on the European Tour's official site

2021
Sports events curtailed due to the COVID-19 pandemic
2021 in golf